Thomas Sidney "Sid" Bevan (2 May 1877 – 17 October 1933) was a Welsh rugby union player who represented Wales and the British Lions. Bevan played club rugby for Swansea, joining the club in 1897.

Rugby career
Bevan came to note as a rugby player while representing local team Morriston RFC. In 1897 he switched to first class side, Swansea, and while playing for Swansea he was selected to play for Wales. His first and only cap was on 2 March 1904 at Balmoral Showgrounds in Belfast against Ireland. In the same year Bevan was selected to represent Bedell Sivright's British Lions on their tour of Australia and New Zealand. He played in four of the tests.

During World War I, Bevan was a second lieutenant in the 6th battalion of the Welch Regiment.

International matches played
Wales
  1904

British Lions
  1904, 1904, 1904
  1904

Bibliography

References

1877 births
1933 deaths
British & Irish Lions rugby union players from Wales
British Army personnel of World War I
Glamorgan County RFC players
Rugby union players from Morriston
Swansea RFC players
Wales international rugby union players
Welch Regiment officers
Welsh rugby union players
Rugby union forwards